This is a list of foreign ministers in 2015.

Africa
 Algeria - Ramtane Lamamra (2013–2017)
 Angola - Georges Rebelo Chicoti (2010–2017)
 Benin
Nassirou Bako Arifari (2011–2015)
Saliou Akadiri (2015–2016)
 Botswana - Pelonomi Venson-Moitoi (2014–2018)
 Burkina Faso
Michel Kafando (2014–2015)
Moussa Nébié (2015–2016)
 Burundi
Laurent Kavakure (2011–2015)
Alain Aimé Nyamitwe   (2015–2018)
 Cameroon
Pierre Moukoko Mbonjo (2011–2015)
Lejeune Mbella Mbella (2015–present)
 Cape Verde - Jorge Tolentino (2014–2016)
 Central African Republic
Toussaint Kongo Doudou (2014–2015)
Samuel Rangba (2015–2016)
 Chad - Moussa Faki (2008–2017)
 Comoros
El-Anrif Said Hassane (2013–2015)
Abdoulkarim Mohamed (2015–present)
 Republic of Congo
Basile Ikouébé (2007–2015)
Jean-Claude Gakosso (2015–present)
 Democratic Republic of Congo - Raymond Tshibanda (2012–2016)
 Côte d'Ivoire - Charles Koffi Diby (2012–2016)
 Djibouti - Mahamoud Ali Youssouf (2005–present)
 Egypt - Sameh Shoukry (2014–present)
 Equatorial Guinea - Agapito Mba Mokuy (2012–2018)
 Eritrea - Osman Saleh Mohammed (2007–present)
 Ethiopia - Tedros Adhanom (2012–2016)
 Gabon - Emmanuel Issoze-Ngondet (2012–2016)
 The Gambia
Bala Garba Jahumpa (2014–2015)
Neneh MacDouall-Gaye (2015–2017)
 Ghana - Hanna Tetteh (2013–2017)
 Guinea - François Lonseny Fall (2012–2016)
 Guinea-Bissau -
Mário Lopes da Rosa (2014–2015)
Rui Dia de Sousa (2015)
Artur Silva (2015–2016)
 Kenya - Amina Mohamed (2013–2018)
 Lesotho
Mohlabi Tsekoa (2007–2015)
Tlohang Sekhamane (2015–2016)
 Liberia -
 Augustine Kpehe Ngafuan (2012–2015)
 Elias Shoniyin   (acting) (2015–2016)
 Libya - disputed
Mohammed al-Dairi (2014–2019) or
Mohamed al-Ghariani (2014–2015)
Ali Ramadan Abou Zekok (2015–2016)
 Madagascar - 
Arisoa Razafitrimo (2014–2015)
Béatrice Atallah (2015–2017)
 Malawi - George Chaponda (2014–2016)
 Mali - Abdoulaye Diop (2014–2017)
 Mauritania - 
Ahmed Ould Teguedi (2013–2015)
Vatma Vall Mint Soueina (2015)
Hamadi Ould Meimou (2015–2016)
 Mauritius - Étienne Sinatambou (2014–2016)
 Morocco - Salaheddine Mezouar (2013–2017)
 Western Sahara - Mohamed Salem Ould Salek (1998–2023)
 Mozambique - Oldemiro Balói (2008–2017)
 Namibia - Netumbo Nandi-Ndaitwah (2012–present)
 Niger
Mohamed Bazoum (2011–2015)
Aïchatou Boulama Kané (2015–2016)
 Nigeria
Aminu Wali (2014–2015)
 Geoffrey Onyeama (2015–present)
 Rwanda - Louise Mushikiwabo (2009–2018)
 São Tomé and Príncipe - Manuel Salvador dos Ramos (2014–2016)
 Senegal - Mankeur Ndiaye (2012–2017)
 Seychelles - 
Jean-Paul Adam (2010–2015)
Joel Morgan (2015–present)
 Sierra Leone - Samura Kamara (2012–2017)
 Somalia -
 Abdirahman Duale Beyle (2014–2015)
 Abdisalam Omer (2015–2017)
 Somaliland -
 Mohamed Yonis (2013–2015)
 Saad Ali Shire (2015–present)
 Puntland - Ali Ahmed Faatah (2014–present)
 South Africa - Maite Nkoana-Mashabane (2009–2018)
 South Sudan - Barnaba Marial Benjamin (2013–2016)
 Sudan -
 Ali Karti (2010–2015)
 Ibrahim Ghandour (2015–2018)
 Swaziland – Mgwagwa Gamedze (2013–2018)
 Tanzania
Bernard Membe (2007–2015)
Augustine Mahiga (2015–2019)
 Togo - Robert Dussey (2013–present)
 Tunisia - 
Mongi Hamdi (2014–2015)
Taïeb Baccouche (2015–2016)
 Uganda - Sam Kutesa (2005–2021)
 Zambia - Harry Kalaba (2014–2018)
 Zimbabwe - Simbarashe Mumbengegwi (2005–2017)

Asia
 Afghanistan - 
Atiqullah Atifmal (acting) (2014–2015)
Salahuddin Rabbani (2015–2019)
 Armenia - Eduard Nalbandyan (2008–2018)
 Azerbaijan - Elmar Mammadyarov (2004–2020)
 Nagorno-Karabakh - Karen Mirzoyan (2012–2017)
 Bahrain - Sheikh Khalid ibn Ahmad Al Khalifah (2005–2020)
 Bangladesh - Abul Hassan Mahmud Ali (2014–2019)
 Bhutan -
 Rinzin Dorje (2013–2015)
 Damcho Dorji (2015-2018)
 Brunei -
 Pengiran Muda Mohamed Bolkiah (1984–2015)
 Hassanal Bolkiah (2015–present)
 Cambodia - Hor Namhong (1998–2016)
 China - Wang Yi (2013–present)
 East Timor - 
José Luís Guterres (2012–2015)
Hernâni Coelho (2015–2017)
 Georgia
Tamar Beruchashvili (2014–2015)
Giorgi Kvirikashvili (2015)
Mikheil Janelidze (2015–2018)
 Abkhazia - Viacheslav Chirikba (2011–2016)
 South Ossetia -
David Sanakoyev (2012–2015)
Kazbulat Tskhovrebov (2015–2016)
 India - Sushma Swaraj (2014-2019)
 Indonesia - Retno Marsudi (2014–present)
 Iran - Mohammad Javad Zarif (2013–2021)
 Iraq - Ibrahim al-Jaafari (2014–2018)
 Kurdistan - Falah Mustafa Bakir (2006–2019)
 Israel
Avigdor Lieberman (2013–2015)
Benjamin Netanyahu (2015–2019)
 Palestinian Authority - Riyad al-Maliki (2007–present)
 Japan - Fumio Kishida (2012–2017)
 Jordan - Nasser Judeh (2009–2017)
 Kazakhstan – Erlan Idrissov (2012–2016)
 North Korea - Ri Su-yong (2014–2016)
 South Korea - Yun Byung-se (2013–2017)
 Kuwait - Sheikh Sabah Al-Khalid Al-Sabah (2011–2019)
 Kyrgyzstan - Erlan Abdyldayev (2012–2018)
 Laos - Thongloun Sisoulith (2006–2016)
 Lebanon - Gebran Bassil (2014–2020)
 Malaysia - Anifah Aman (2009–2018)
 Maldives - Dunya Maumoon (2013–2016)
 Mongolia - Lundeg Purevsuren (2014–2016)
 Myanmar - Wunna Maung Lwin (2011–2016)
 Nepal
Mahendra Pandey (2014–2015)
Kamal Thapa (2015–2016)
 Oman - Yusuf bin Alawi bin Abdullah (1982–2020)
 Pakistan - Sartaj Aziz (2013–2017) 
 Philippines - Albert del Rosario (2011–2016)
 Qatar - Khalid bin Mohammad Al Attiyah (2013–2016)

 Saudi Arabia
Prince Saud bin Faisal bin Abdulaziz Al Saud (1975–2015)
Adel al-Jubeir (2015–2018)
 Singapore
K. Shanmugam (2011–2015)
Vivian Balakrishnan (2015–present)
 Sri Lanka
G. L. Peiris (2010–2015)
Mangala Samaraweera (2015–2017)
 Syria - Walid Muallem (2006–2020)
 Taiwan - David Lin (2012–2016)
 Tajikistan - Sirodjidin Aslov (2013–present)
 Thailand -
 Thanasak Patimaprakorn (2014–2015)
 Don Pramudwinai (2015–present)
 Turkey
Mevlüt Çavuşoğlu (2014–2015)
Feridun Sinirlioğlu (2015)
Mevlüt Çavuşoğlu (2015–present)
 Turkmenistan - Raşit Meredow (2001–present)
 United Arab Emirates - Sheikh Abdullah bin Zayed Al Nahyan (2006–present)
 Uzbekistan - Abdulaziz Komilov (2012–present)
 Vietnam - Phạm Bình Minh (2011–2021)
 Yemen 
Abdullah al-Saidi (2014–2015)
disputed -
 Vacant (2015) or
1. Riyadh Yassin (2015)
2. Abdulmalik Al-Mekhlafi (2015–2018)

Europe
 Albania - Ditmir Bushati (2013–2019)
 Andorra - Gilbert Saboya Sunyé (2011–2017)
 Austria - Sebastian Kurz (2013–2017)
 Belarus - Vladimir Makei (2012–present)
 Belgium - Didier Reynders (2011–2019)
 Brussels-Capital Region - Guy Vanhengel (2013–2019)
 Flanders - Geert Bourgeois (2014–2019)
 Wallonia - Paul Magnette (2014–2017)
 Bosnia and Herzegovina
Zlatko Lagumdžija (2012–2015)
Igor Crnadak (2015–2019)
 Bulgaria - Daniel Mitov (2014–2017)
 Croatia - Vesna Pusić (2011–2016)
 Cyprus - Ioannis Kasoulidis (2013–2018)
 Northern Cyprus
Özdil Nami (2013–2015)
Emine Çolak (2015–2016)
 Czech Republic - Lubomír Zaorálek (2014–2017)
 Denmark
Martin Lidegaard (2014–2015)
Kristian Jensen (2015–2016)
 Greenland - Vittus Qujaukitsoq (2014–2017)
 Faroe Islands -
 Kaj Leo Johannesen (2011–2015)
 Poul Michelsen (2015–2019)
 Estonia
Keit Pentus-Rosimannus (2014–2015)
Jürgen Ligi (acting) (2015)
Marina Kaljurand (2015–2016)
 Finland
Erkki Tuomioja (2011–2015)
Timo Soini (2015–2019)
 France - Laurent Fabius (2012–2016)
 Germany - Frank-Walter Steinmeier (2013–2017)
 Greece - 
Evangelos Venizelos (2013–2015)
Nikos Kotzias (2015)
Petros Molyviatis (2015)
Nikos Kotzias (2015–2018)
 Hungary - Péter Szijjártó (2014–present)
 Iceland - Gunnar Bragi Sveinsson (2013–2016)
 Ireland - Charles Flanagan (2014–2017)
 Italy - Paolo Gentiloni (2014–2016)
 Latvia - Edgars Rinkēvičs (2011–present)
 Liechtenstein - Aurelia Frick (2009–2019)
 Lithuania - Linas Antanas Linkevičius (2012–2020)
 Luxembourg - Jean Asselborn (2004–present)
 Macedonia - Nikola Poposki (2011–2017)
 Malta - George Vella (2013–2017)
 Moldova - Natalia Gherman (2013–2016)
 Transnistria
Nina Shtanski (2012–2015)
Vitaly Ignatyev (acting) (2015–present)
 Gagauzia -
Svetlana Gradinari (2013-2015)
Vitaliy Vlah (2015-present)
 Monaco
José Badia (2011–2015)
Gilles Tonelli (2015–2019)
 Montenegro - Igor Lukšić (2012–2016)
 Netherlands - Bert Koenders (2014–2017)
 Norway - Børge Brende (2013–2017)
 Poland
Grzegorz Schetyna (2014–2015)
Witold Waszczykowski (2015–2018)
 Portugal
Rui Machete (2013–2015)
Augusto Santos Silva (2015–2022)
 Romania
Bogdan Aurescu (2014–2015)
Lazăr Comănescu (2015–2017)
 Russia - Sergey Lavrov (2004–present)
 San Marino - Pasquale Valentini (2012–2016)
 Serbia - Ivica Dačić (2014–2020)
 Kosovo - Hashim Thaçi (2014–2016)
 Slovakia - Miroslav Lajčák (2012–2020)
 Slovenia - Karl Erjavec (2012–2018)
 Spain - José Manuel García-Margallo (2011–2016)
 Catalonia - Francesc Homs Molist (2012–2015)
 Sweden - Margot Wallström (2014–2019)
 Switzerland - Didier Burkhalter (2012–2017)

 Ukraine - Pavlo Klimkin (2014–2019)
 United Kingdom - Philip Hammond (2014–2016)
 Scotland - Fiona Hyslop (2009–2020)
 Jersey - Sir Philip Bailhache (2013–2018)
 Vatican City - Archbishop Paul Gallagher (2014–present)

North America and the Caribbean
 Antigua and Barbuda - Charles Fernandez (2014–2018)
 The Bahamas - Fred Mitchell (2012–2017)
 Barbados - Maxine McClean (2008–2018)
 Belize - Wilfred Elrington (2008–2020)
 Canada -
 John Baird (2011–2015)
 Ed Fast (acting) (2015)
 Rob Nicholson (2015)
 Stéphane Dion (2015–2017)
 Quebec - Christine St-Pierre (2014–2018)
 Costa Rica - Manuel González Sanz (2014–2018)
 Cuba - Bruno Rodríguez Parrilla (2009–present)
 Dominica - Francine Baron (2014–2019)
 Dominican Republic - Andrés Navarro (2014–2016)
 El Salvador - Hugo Martínez (2014–2018)
 Grenada - Clarice Modeste-Curwen (2014–2016)
 Guatemala - Carlos Raúl Morales (2014–2017)
 Haiti -
 Duly Brutus (2014–2015)
 Lener Renauld (acting) (2015–2016)
 Honduras -
 Mireya Agüero (2013–2015)
 Arturo Corrales (2015–2016)
 Jamaica - Arnold Nicholson (2012–2016)
 Mexico
José Antonio Meade Kuribreña (2012–2015)
Claudia Ruiz Massieu (2015–2017)
 Nicaragua - Samuel Santos López (2007–2017)
 Panama - Isabel Saint Malo (2014–2019)
 Puerto Rico –
David Bernier (2013–2015)
Javier González (acting) (2015)
Víctor Suárez Meléndez (2015–2017)
 Saint Kitts and Nevis -
 Patrice Nisbett (2013–2015)
 Mark Brantley (2015–present)
 Saint Lucia - Alva Baptiste (2011–2016)
 Saint Vincent and the Grenadines
Camillo Gonsalves (2013–2015)
Sir Louis Straker (2015–2020)
 Trinidad and Tobago
Winston Dookeran (2012–2015)
Dennis Moses (2015–2020)
 United States of America - John Kerry (2013–2017)

Oceania
 Australia - Julie Bishop (2013–2018)
 Fiji - Ratu Inoke Kubuabola (2009–2016)
 French Polynesia - Édouard Fritch (2014–present)
 Kiribati - Anote Tong (2003–2016)
 Marshall Islands - Tony deBrum (2014–2016)
 Micronesia - Lorin S. Robert (2007–2019)
 Nauru - Baron Waqa (2013–2019)
 New Zealand - Murray McCully (2008–2017)
 Cook Islands - Henry Puna (2013–2020)
 Niue - Toke Talagi (2008–2020)
 Tokelau
Kuresa Nasau (2014–2015)
Siopili Perez (2015–2016)
 Palau - Billy Kuartei (2013–2017)
 Papua New Guinea - Rimbink Pato (2012–2019)
 Samoa - Tuilaepa Aiono Sailele Malielegaoi (1998–2021)
 Solomon Islands - Milner Tozaka (2014–2019)
 Tonga - ʻAkilisi Pōhiva (2014–2017)
 Tuvalu - Taukelina Finikaso (2013–2019)
 Vanuatu
Sato Kilman (2014–2015)
Kalvau Moli (2015)
Serge Vohor (2015)
Havo Moli (2015–2016)

South America
 Argentina
Héctor Timerman (2010–2015)
Susana Malcorra (2015–2017)
 Bolivia - David Choquehuanca (2006–2017)
 Brazil -
 Luiz Alberto Figueiredo (2013–2015)
 Mauro Vieira (2015–2016)
 Chile - Heraldo Muñoz (2014–2018)
 Colombia - María Ángela Holguín (2010–2018)
 Ecuador - Ricardo Patiño (2010–2016)
 Guyana -
 Carolyn Rodrigues (2008–2015)
 Carl Greenidge (2015–2019)
 Paraguay - Eladio Loizaga (2013–2018)
 Peru
Gonzalo Gutiérrez Reinel (2014–2015)
Ana María Sánchez (2015–2016)
 Suriname
Winston Lackin (2010–2015)
Niermala Badrising (2015–2017)
 Uruguay - 
 Luis Almagro (2010–2015)
 Rodolfo Nin Novoa (2015–2020)
 Venezuela - Delcy Rodríguez (2014–2017)

References

http://rulers.org

Foreign ministers
2015 in international relations

Foreign ministers
2015